Larry Bishop (born November 30, 1948) is an American actor, screenwriter and film director. He is the son of Sylvia Ruzga and comedian Joey Bishop. He has been featured in many Hollywood movies including Hell Ride.

Early life 
Bishop attended Beverly Hills High School. His fellow alumni Rob Reiner and Richard Dreyfuss appear with him in Mad Dog Time, as does Joey Bishop.

Career 
His television credits include writing for (and appearances on) The Hollywood Palace (with then-partner Rob Reiner), and appearances on I Dream of Jeannie, Love, American Style, Barney Miller, Laverne & Shirley and Kung Fu.

His movie credits include roles in Kill Bill: Volume 2, The Big Fix, The Savage Seven, and as the hook-handed musician Abraham "The Hook" Salteen in Wild in the Streets. He wrote, directed and appeared in Mad Dog Time in 1996, reuniting him with Streets costar Christopher Jones in Jones' final film appearance. His most recent movies are 2008's Hell Ride, in collaboration with Quentin Tarantino, and 2010's Forgotten Pills.

Filmography

Actor
 1968: Wild in the Streets by Barry Shear: Abraham Salteen (The Hook)
 1968: The Savage Seven by Richard Rush: Joint
 1969: The Devil's 8 by Burt Topper: Chandler
 1969: I Dream of Jeannie - Season 5, episode 14: Dick
 1970: Angel Unchained by Lee Madden: Pilote
 1971: Chrome and Hot Leather by Lee Frost: Gabe
 1973: Love, American Style - Season 4, episode 20:  1973: Kung Fu - Season 1, episode 12 : Major Trapnell 1973: The Third Girl from the Left (TV) by Peter Medak:Bradford 1973: Soul Hustler by Burt Topper: Brian 1974: Shanks by William Castle: Napoleon 1975: How Come Nobody's on Our Side? by Richard Michaels: Brandy 1975: All Together Now (TV) by Randal Kleiser: Mike 1976: Barney Miller - Season 2, episode 18: Hurley 1976: The Day the Lord Got Busted by Burt Topper: Brian 1978: Laverne & Shirley - Season 4, episode 4: Jake 1978: The Big Fix by Jeremy Kagan: Wilson 1979: Barnaby Jones - Season 7, episodes 14 and 15: Harley Jessup / Lee Henderson 1979: Beanes of Boston - Pilot: Mr. Lucas 1979: The Dukes of Hazzard - Season 1, episode 4: Joey Sagalo 1979: High Midnight (TV) by Daniel Haller
 1979: C.H.O.M.P.S. by Don Chaffey: Ken Sharp  1980: Condominium (TV) by Sidney Hayers: Julian Higbee 1982: Hey Good Lookin' by Ralph Bakshi: Stomper (voice)
 1983: The Sting II by Jeremy Kagan: Gellecher, one of Lonnegan's bodyguards 1996: Underworld by Roger Christian: Ned Lynch 1996: Mad Dog Time by Larry Bishop: Nick 2004: Kill Bill: Volume 2 by Quentin Tarantino: Larry Gomez 2006: The Lather Effect by Sarah Kelly
 2008: Hell Ride by Larry Bishop: Pistolero 2010: Forgotten Pills by David Hefner: Mathis 2015: Misirlou by Trevor Simms: Larry with GunsFilm director
1996: Mad Dog Time2008: Hell RideScreenwriter
1996: Underworld by Roger Christian
1996: Mad Dog Time2008: Hell RideProducer
1996: Mad Dog Time 
2008: Hell Ride''

References

External links

 at Hollywood.com

American male film actors
American film directors
American male screenwriters
American male television actors
Male actors from Philadelphia
Living people
1948 births
Screenwriters from Pennsylvania
Jewish American male actors
American people of Polish-Jewish descent
Jewish American screenwriters
21st-century American Jews